Banga, Punjab may refer to:
 Banga, India in  Shahid Bhagat Singh Nagar District, Punjab State
 Banga, Pakistan in Faisalabad District, Punjab Province